Yurtsever is a village in the Ardeşen District, Rize Province, in Black Sea Region of Turkey. Its population is 147 (2021).

History 
According to list of villages in Laz language book (2009), name of the village is Zenimoshi, which means "open field" in Laz language. Most villagers are ethnically Hemshin.

Geography

References

Villages in Ardeşen District